The 1947 Pittsburgh Panthers football team was an American football team that represented the University of Pittsburgh as an independent in the 1947 college football season.  In its first season under head coach Mike Milligan, the team compiled a 1–8 record and was outscored by a total of 267 to 26.

Schedule

References

Pittsburgh
Pittsburgh Panthers football seasons
Pittsburgh Panthers football